is a Japanese footballer who plays as a forward.

Club career

High school football
Having developed in the academy of professional club Cerezo Osaka, Chiba moved to the Kokoku High School in September 2021 to continue his footballing career. While at the high school, he was selected by German club Bayern Munich to be part of their "World Squad" initiative, representing the club in international friendlies. He scored in a friendly game against the under-20 team of Brazilian club Vasco da Gama.

While training with the World Squad, Chiba missed important games with Kokoku, including a loss to the Kandai Hokuyo-Osaka High School in the Inter-High Osaka preliminary competition. On his return to Kokoku, he established himself as one of the key players in the team.

International career
In January 2020, Chiba was called up to the Japan national under-16 football team for a tour of Turkey, playing in friendlies against the Czech Republic and Tunisia.

Personal life
Chiba's brother, Daigo, is also a footballer, and currently plays at the Kwansei Gakuin University.

References

External links
 

2005 births
Living people
Japanese footballers
Japan youth international footballers
Association football forwards
Association football midfielders
Cerezo Osaka players